Warren Elliott (born 1979) is an eight-time National Chess Champion of Jamaica. He has won the most National Chess Championships in Jamaica and is the only player to win with a perfect score. He has represented Jamaica in eight Chess Olympiads (Elista, Russia 1998, Istanbul, Turkey 2000, Bled, Slovenia 2002, Turin, Italy 2006, Dresden, Germany 2008,   Khanty-Mansiysk, Russia 2010,  Istanbul, Turkey 2012 and Baku, Azerbaijan 2016) He was the Technical Director/Coach of Jamaica's 2014 chess Olympiad Team in Tromso, Norway. He is currently the number one ranked player in Jamaica and the English Speaking Caribbean and one of only five FIDE Masters (an international chess title) in the country. He obtained the rank of FIDE Master in the 2.3.5 Subzonal chess tournament in Venezuela.

References

External links

1979 births
Jamaican chess players
Chess FIDE Masters
Living people